Dicarpellum is a genus of shrubs and small trees in the family Celastraceae.  The genus is  endemic to New Caledonia in the Pacific and contains four species.  Its closest relative is Hypsophila from Australia.

List of species 

 Dicarpellum baillonianum 
 Dicarpellum pancheri 
 Dicarpellum paucisepalum 
 Dicarpellum pronyense

References 

Celastraceae
Celastrales genera
Endemic flora of New Caledonia